The Gift of Game is the debut studio album by American band Crazy Town. It was released on November 9, 1999 in the U.S. by Columbia Records. The album yielded the band its biggest hit to date with "Butterfly" which reached number 1 on the Billboard Hot 100 on March 24, 2001.

Worldwide the album sold more than 2.5 million units, with more than 1.6 million in the US alone.

The girl licking the lollipop on the cover of the album is a fictional character created by Crazy Town, known as "Little Lolita". Both the album title and the picture of Little Lolita are based on lyrics from the song "Lollipop Porn". The album cover was designed by co-lead singer Shifty Shellshock's father and uncle. A song titled "Lolita" later appeared on Shellshock's solo album Happy Love Sick and her image reappears on Crazy Town's third album The Brimstone Sluggers.

Reception

Steve Huey at AllMusic described the album as "similar to many other rap-inflected alternative metal albums in that it concentrates on sound over structure, creating macho, aggressive grooves with grinding, noisily textured guitars and the underlying feel of squared-off hip-hop beats". Huey argued that despite signs of Limp Bizkit's "juvenile humor", the album "shows promise". April Long of NME criticized the album for its generic guitar riffs, and containing "some of the most Neanderthal lyrics ever written".

About the album's lyrics, Shifty Shellshock said: "We’re just having a good time. We’re not like political or anything. I can be very sarcastic just like a little punk, we talk a lot of trash. We have some points, like 'learn from your mistakes', 'check yourself', you know, 'don’t get taken advantage of'. Real simple things, nothing too overwhelming".

Track listing

Charts

Weekly charts

Year-end charts

Certifications

Singles

Personnel
Crazy Town
Epic – vocals; keyboards
Shifty Shellshock – vocals
Rust Epique – guitars
Anthony Valli – guitars
Doug Miller – bass
DJ AM – turntables
James Bradley Jr. – drums

Additional personnel
Troy Van Leeuwen – guitars on "Darkside"
Jay Gordon – keyboards on "Darkside", refrain in "Black Cloud" 
Stephen Costantino – guitars on "Revolving Door" and "Hollywood Babylon"
KRS-One

References

1999 debut albums
Crazy Town albums
Albums produced by Josh Abraham